Stomatia, common name the keeled wide mouths, is a genus of sea snails, marine gastropod mollusks in the family Trochidae, the top snails.

Description
The spiral shell is oblong or depressed orbicular. The spire is prominent but short. The surface is tubercled or keeled. The whorls show a series of short folds below the suture. The aperture is either oblong or transversely oval, and
longer than wide or the reverse. The interior of the shell is nacreous. There is no operculum.

Stomatia is closely allied to Stomatella, differing in the generally more elongated shell with a series of short folds or puckers below the sutures. Usually the body whorl has a tuberculous carina.

The animal is too large to entirely enter the shell. The foot is large, fleshy, tubercular, greatly produced posteriorly. The epipodium is fringed, with a more prominent fimbriated lobe behind the left tentacle, and on the right there is a slightly projecting fold or gutter leading to the respiratory cavity. There are digitated intertentacular lobes.

Distribution
This marine genus occurs in tropical Indo-West Pacific, Oceania, Korea and Australia.

Species
Species within the genus Stomatia include:
 Stomatia decussata A. Adams, 1850
 Stomatia phymotis (Hebling, 1779)
 Stomatia splendidula A. Adams, 1855

The Indo-Pacific Molluscan Database also mentions the following species 
 Stomatia acuminata A. Adams, 1850
 Stomatia sulcata (Lamarck, 1816) (synonyms: Stomatolina rubra (Lamarck, 1822), Stomatella sulcata Lamarck, 1816 and Stomatia sculpturata Preston, 1914)

Species brought into synonymy
 Stomatia angulata A. Adams, 1850: synonym of Stomatolina angulata (A. Adams, 1850)
 Stomatia australis A. Adams, 1850: synonym of Stomatia phymotis Helbling, 1779
 Stomatia azonea Brusina, 1865: synonym of Megalomphalus azoneus (Brusina, 1865)
 Stomatia depressa Sowerby, 1874: synonym of Stomatolina sanguinea (A. Adams, 1850) 
 Stomatia duplicata G.B. Sowerby I, 1823: synonym of Stomatella duplicata (G. B. Sowerby I, 1823)
 Stomatia kutschigi Brusina, 1865: synonym of Fossarus ambiguus (Linnaeus, 1758)
 Stomatia obscurata Lamarck, 1822: synonym of Stomatia phymotis Helbling, 1779
 Stomatia picta d'Orbigny, 1847: synonym of Synaptocochlea picta (d'Orbigny, 1847)
 Stomatia planulata Schepman, 1908: synonym of Microtis tuberculata A. Adams, 1850
 Stomatia (Microtis) heckeliana Crosse, 1871: synonym of Microtis tuberculata A. Adams, 1850
 Stomatia (Miraconcha) obscura Sowerby, G.B. III, 1874: synonym of Stomatia phymotis (Hebling, 1779)

References

 Helbling, 1779: Abhandlungen einer Privatgesellschaft in Böhmen zur Aufnahme der Mathematik, der vaterländischen Geschichte und der Naturgeschichte, 4: 124
 Higo, S., Callomon, P. & Goto, Y. (2001) Catalogue and Bibliography of the Marine Shell-Bearing Mollusca of Japan. Gastropoda Bivalvia Polyplacophora Scaphopoda Type Figures. Elle Scientific Publications, Yao, Japan, 208 pp.

 
Trochidae
Gastropod genera